Leneve Damens (born 30 May 1993) is a Namibian rugby union player. He was named in Namibia's squad for the 2015 Rugby World Cup.

References

1993 births
Living people
Namibian rugby union players
Namibia international rugby union players
Place of birth missing (living people)
Rugby union flankers
Rugby union number eights
Welwitschias players